Stempfferia staudingeri, the black-square epitola, is a butterfly in the family Lycaenidae. It is found in Sierra Leone, Ivory Coast and Ghana. The habitat consists of forests.

Etymology
The specific name honours Otto Staudinger.

References

Seitz, A. Die Gross-Schmetterlinge der Erde 13: Die Afrikanischen Tagfalter. Plate XIII 65 d

Butterflies described in 1890
Poritiinae
Butterflies of Africa